The 2018–19 Eastern Illinois Panthers men's basketball team represented Eastern Illinois University during the 2018–19 NCAA Division I men's basketball season. The Panthers, led by seventh-year head coach Jay Spoonhour, played their home games at Lantz Arena as members of the Ohio Valley Conference. They finished the season 14–18, 7–11 in OVC play to finish in sixth place. They lost to UT Martin in the first round of the OVC tournament.

Previous season 
The Panthers finished the 2017–18 season 12–19, 7–11 in OVC play to finish in eighth place. They defeated Tennessee State in the first round of the OVC tournament before losing in the quarterfinals to Austin Peay.

Preseason 
In a vote of conference coaches and sports information directors, EIU was picked to finish in 7th place in the OVC.

Preseason All-OVC team
The Panthers had one player selected to the preseason all-OVC team.

Terrell Lewis — Guard

Roster

Schedule and results

|-
!colspan=9 style=|Exhibition

|-
!colspan=9 style=|Non-conference regular season

|-
!colspan=9 style=| Ohio Valley Conference regular season

|-
!colspan=9 style=|Ohio Valley tournament

Source

References

Eastern Illinois Panthers men's basketball seasons
Eastern Illinois